The Dudelange Radio Tower is a 285-meter (935 ft) high freestanding steel framework FM radio and television transmission tower, also called a lattice tower, with a triangular cross section located near Dudelange in Luxembourg. When completed in 1957 the Dudelange Radio Tower was the tallest structure in Luxembourg and the fourth tallest lattice tower in the world after the Tokyo, Eiffel and KCTV towers. It remains the tallest freestanding structure in Luxembourg today and the 5th tallest structure overall in the country.

Plane Crash
On 31 July 1981, a Belgian (Mirage IIIE) military aircraft crashed into the tower at mid-height, tearing down the upper section of the tower. The pilot did not survive the crash, additionally debris from the tower also fell on a nearby house and tragically killed two broadcast engineers who lived there. The tower was reconstructed the following year.

Stations

Radio
FM stations that transmit from the Dudelange Radio Tower include the following

See also
 Lattice tower
 List of tallest freestanding steel structures
 List of catastrophic collapses of broadcast masts and towers
 List of tallest structures in Luxembourg
 List of famous transmission sites

References

External links
 
 http://www.skyscraperpage.com/diagrams/?b45490
 https://theantennasite.com/countries/luxembourg/dudelange-ginzebierg.html

Lattice towers
Towers in Luxembourg
Radio Tower
Transmitter sites in Luxembourg
Towers completed in 1957
1957 establishments in Luxembourg